Hrudaya Geethe is a 1989 Indian Kannada-language romance film directed and produced by H. R. Bhargava. The story by Phani Ramachandra was loosely based on the 1970 movie Pagla Kahin Ka. The film stars Vishnuvardhan, Bhavya and Khushbu.

Plot
Ashok, a mentally disturbed man, is accused of murder. According to the court's order, he is sent to a mental asylum. Aruna, his childhood friend, who is also his doctor, decides to help him. Ashok reveals that he his pretending to be mentally ill for the sake of his lover Asha. Asha, an athlete, has accidentally murdered her house owner for misbehaving with her. In order to save her reputation, Ashok has taken blame for the murder and is pretending to be mentally ill. Ashok is released from the asylum but on seeing Asha marry someone else, he becomes mad for real and is re-admitted to the asylum. Aruna takes charge and seeks the married Asha's help to make Ashok realize the reality and so he recovers from his illness. Eventually Ashok is cured and he also exposes the illegal activities being carried out in the asylum by Aruna's father and fiancé.

Cast
 Vishnuvardhan as Ashok
 Bhavya as Aruna
 Khushbu as Asha
 Sridhar 
 Balakrishna
 Umashree
 Devaraj
 Mukhyamantri Chandru
 Manu
 Ramesh Bhat
 Sihi Kahi Chandru
 Sudheer
 Mysore Lokesh
 Dinesh

Soundtrack 
The music of the film was composed by Rajan–Nagendra. The songs "Yuga Yugagale Saagali" and title song "Hrudaya Geethe Haaduthire" were received extremely well.

References

External links 
 
 Hrudaya Geethe at Raaga

1989 films
1980s Kannada-language films
Indian romance films
Films scored by Rajan–Nagendra
Films directed by H. R. Bhargava
1980s romance films